"Shake It Up" is a single by American performance artist Divine, released in 1983. The song was later reissued on the 1984 compilation album The Story So Far.

Chart performance
"Shake It Up" became Divine's fourth and last single to chart on the Dutch Singles Chart.  It debuted at #30 before climbing to and peaking at #13 in its third week.  The song spent a total of 6 weeks on the chart.

"Shake It Up" spent a total of 11 weeks on the German Singles Chart and peaked at #26.  It spent one week at its peak.  "Shake It Up" became Divine's second Top 40 single on the chart.

Track listings
Dutch Vinyl, 7-inch single
 "Shake It Up" - 3:11
 "Shake It Up (Album Version)" - 5:50
 "Jungle Jezebel" - 4:42

German Vinyl, 12-inch single
 "Shake It Up (Special Long Version)" - 6:41
 "Shake It Up (Ed Smit Remix)" - 9:28
 "Shake It Up (Instrumental Version)" - 4:00

Charts

References

1983 singles
Divine (performer) songs
1983 songs
Songs written by Bobby Orlando
Song recordings produced by Bobby Orlando